Vinary is a municipality and village in Hradec Králové District in the Hradec Králové Region of the Czech Republic. It has about 500 inhabitants.

Administrative parts
Villages of Janovice, Kozojídky and Smidarská Lhota are administrative parts of Vinary.

References

Villages in Hradec Králové District